Pterotyphis is a genus of predatory sea snails, marine gastropod molluscs in the family Muricidae, the rock snails.

Species
Species within the genus Pterotyphis include:

Pterotyphis fimbriatus (A. Adams, 1854)
Pterotyphis pinnatus (Broderip, 1833)
Pterotyphis ryalli (Houart, 1996)

References

 Powell A W B, New Zealand Mollusca, William Collins Publishers Ltd, Auckland, New Zealand 1979